Ronald Alexander Blackwood (January 19, 1926 – February 22, 2017) was a Jamaican-born American politician who served as the Mayor of Mount Vernon, New York, for eleven years from 1985 until 1996. On January 25, 1985, Blackwood became the first black Mayor of Mount Vernon, as well as the first black person elected mayor of any municipality in New York state.

Blackwood was born in Saint Andrew Parish, Jamaica, on January 19, 1926. He immigrated from Jamaica to the United States when he was 28-years old and settled in the New York City suburb of Mount Vernon, New York. He received his bachelor's degree in management from Iona College. Professionally, Blackwood worked for the Honeywell corporation's medical electronics division in Pleasantville, New York, for more than thirty years.

Before becoming mayor, Blackwood served as a member of the Westchester County Board of Supervisors (now known as the Westchester County Board of Legislators) and the Mount Vernon city council for four terms.

Blackwood died from complications of Parkinson's disease at his home in New Smyrna Beach, Florida, on February 22, 2017, at the age of 91. He was survived by his wife of 38 years, Ann Griffin Blackwood, and daughter, Helen Blackwood.

References

1926 births
2017 deaths
Mayors of places in New York (state)
Westchester County, New York Executives
Politicians from Westchester County, New York
New York (state) city council members
Iona University alumni
Emigrants from British Jamaica to the United States
American politicians of Jamaican descent
New York (state) Democrats
Politicians from Mount Vernon, New York
Politicians from Kingston, Jamaica
People from New Smyrna Beach, Florida
New York (state) Republicans
Legislators from Westchester County, New York
African-American mayors in New York (state)